Hans Friedrich (2 February 1917 – 25 June 1998) was a German politician of the Free Democratic Party (FDP) and former member of the German Bundestag.

Life 
In the 1949 federal elections he was elected to the first German Bundestag on the Hessian state list of the FDP.

Literature

References

1917 births
1998 deaths
Members of the Bundestag for Hesse
Members of the Bundestag 1949–1953
Members of the Bundestag for the Free Democratic Party (Germany)